Events from the year 1949 in South Korea.

Incumbents
President: Rhee Syng-man 
Vice President: Yi Si-yeong
Prime Minister: Yi Pom-sok

Events
May 23-Committee for the Five Northern Korean Provinces was established.

Births

 12 February - Hyun Jae-hyun.
 2 September - Bak Il.

See also
 List of South Korean films of 1949

References

 
South Korea
Years of the 20th century in South Korea
1940s in South Korea
South Korea